ACS Photonics is a monthly, peer-reviewed, scientific journal, first published in January 2014 by the American Chemical Society. The current editor in chief is Romain Quidant (ETH Zürich). The interdisciplinary journal publishes original research articles, letters, comments, reviews and perspectives.

Scope
The focus of ACS Photonics is the science of photonics and light-matter interactions. The areas of research reported in the journal are:

Nanophotonics, including plasmonics and polaritonics
Optical materials, including quantum/topological materials, 2D materials and phase change materials
AI for photonics (e.g. Inverse design) and photonics for AI (e.g. optical computing)
Integrated photonics
Light sources, including new classes of lasing devices and LED with improved performance and new integration strategies
Photodetection, including new device principles, device physics and device architectures
Nonlinear optics
Quantum photonics
Photonics-based wearables
Virtual and augmented reality
Photonics for energy, including photonic enhancement to solar energy harvesting, waste heat harvesting (thermophotovoltaics), and wireless photonic energy transmission
Biophotonics, advanced optical imaging, photonics-based biosensing
Optical trapping and optical manipulation
Optomechanics
Fundamentals of light-matter interaction
Electron-beam spectroscopies and ultrafast electron microscopy
Terahertz photonics, including devices, imaging and spectroscopy

Abstracting and indexing
ACS Photonics is indexed in the following databases:

Chemical Abstracts Service – CASSI
Chemistry Citation Index
Science Citation Index Expanded 
Current Contents – Engineering, Computing & Technology
Current Contents - Physical, Chemical & Earth Sciences
Scopus
MEDLINE/PubMed

According to the 2015 Journal Citation Reports published by Thomson Reuters on June 13, 2016, ACS Photonics has received its first impact factor of 5.404.  According to the Journal Citation Reports, the journal has a 2021 impact factor of 7.077.

References

External links
 

Photonics
Optics journals
Nanotechnology journals
Monthly journals
English-language journals
Publications established in 2014
2014 establishments in the United States
Photonics